Carol Rose Roberts (born November 9, 1942) is an American politician who served as a member of the New Hampshire House of Representatives. First elected in 2014, she won reelection in 2016 before resigning in 2018 on her relocation outside of her district.

References

External links

Democratic Party members of the New Hampshire House of Representatives
1942 births
Living people
Women state legislators in New Hampshire
21st-century American politicians
21st-century American women politicians